Bong tree may refer to:

 Machilus kurzii, a tree in the laurel family
 Edward Lear, who mentioned the bong tree in "The Owl and the Pussycat"
 "The Owl and the Pussycat", a poem by Lear, where the famous phrase where the Bong-tree grows originates
 The Tale of Little Pig Robinson by Beatrix Potter, written as a prequel to  Edward Lear's "The Owl and the Pussycat" and features the land where the Bong tree grows as a locale
 Where the Bong Tree Grows, a book by James Ramsey Ullman
Or in the song - The Moss by Cosmo Seldrake